Henry Seymour MP, JP (10 November 1776 – 27 November 1849), of Knoyle House, East Knoyle, Wiltshire, of Trent, and of Northbrook, was a British Tory politician.

He was the only son of Henry Seymour, of Redland Court, Gloucestershire and his second wife, the Comtesse de Panthou.

He was elected as a Member of Parliament (MP) for the borough of Taunton at the 1826 general election, having contested the borough unsuccessfully in 1820, and held the seat until he stood down at the 1830 general election. He was also a Justice of the Peace (JP).

Family
 
He married on 12 January 1817 Jane Hopkinson (d. 14 March 1869), daughter of Benjamin Hopkinson, of Bath and of Blagdon Court, Somerset. They had five children:
Henry Danby Seymour, of Trent (1820–1877)
Alfred Seymour, of Knoyle House, Wiltshire, and of Trent (1824–1888)
Jane Seymour (d. 18 September 1892), m. 21 August 1847 Philip Pleydell-Bouverie, of Brymore (21 April 1821 – 10 March 1890), son of Hon. Philip Pleydell-Bouverie, and had issue
Sarah Ellen Seymour (d. 14 August 1867), m. 14 May 1857 William Ayshford Sanford, of Nynehead Court, Somerset (2 December 1818 – 28 October 1902)
Louisa Caroline Harcourt Seymour (d. 31 October 1889), m. 2 September 1862 Maj.-Gen. Sir Creswicke Henry Rawlinson, 1st Baronet (11 April 1810 – 5 March 1895), by whom she had two sons

With Felicite Dailly-Brimont he had an illegitimate daughter Henriette Felicite (1803–1868) who married Sir James Tichborne, the 10th Baronet, father of Roger Charles Tichborne, the heir who was lost at sea in 1854 and whose impersonator, Arthur Orton, was 'The Tichborne Claimant' in the famous trial. Felicity Dailly-Brimont was reputed to have been the illegitimate daughter of the Duc de Bourbon Conti and his mistress Marie Claude Gaucher-Dailly. (see The Naughty Seymours by Bernard Falk; Hutchinson &Co 1940)

References

External links

 

1776 births
1849 deaths
Members of the Parliament of the United Kingdom for English constituencies
UK MPs 1826–1830
English people of French descent
Henry Seymour, of Knoyle House, Wiltshire, of Trent, and of Northbrook
Tory MPs (pre-1834)